Awai may refer to:

People
 , cyclist
 Nicole Awai (born 1966), American artist and educator

Places
 Awai Station, Japan